Makafaat is a Pakistani anthology drama series, that airs on Geo TV and was created by Abdullah Kadwani and Asad Qureshi. It premiered on 28 September 2019. It featured different short stories in each episode focusing on social issues.

Synopsis
The anthology follows different stories and characters depicting the theme of Karma and Huqooq-ul-Ibaad. The Drama series tells stories of fate’s connection with our deeds, showing how people are often held accountable for their willful actions even before the afterlife and reflects on negative virtues such as greed, envy, heedlessness, pride, malice, covetousness, and hatred in its standalone episodes.

Episodes

Series overview

Season 1

Season 2

Season 3

Season 4

Release

Makafaat was a segment for Ramadan special transmission "Ehsaas Ramzan" in May 2019 and was broadcast throughout the Ramzan daily. However, later on in late September 2019, it was revamped as a separate series airing two episodes from Monday to Friday and became more popular as a separate series. On 31 December, the first season of the series released for streaming on Amazon Prime.

It gained much popularity during its rerun and was renewed for Season 2. The 2nd season was released in two parts. The first part premiered in the month of Ramadan (April and May). The second part of season 2 premiered on 6 August 2020, ending on 17 August.

In January 2021, it was revealed that season 3 was in development and was slated to air in Ramadan 2021. The first promo of the third season featuring various artists was released on 8 April 2021. The season premiered on 12 April airing episodes daily at 7:00 P.M PST. Later in June, the third season of the series was launched again featuring a mix of new and old episodes from the third season, airing daily at 7:00 PM.

The teaser for the fourth season released on 15 March 2022, featuring various artists. The season premiered on 25 March 2020, airing episodes daily at 7:00 P.M.

Spin-Off

Dikhawa
Due to the success of Makafaat, Abdullah and Asad developed another morality-based anthology series under the title "Dikhawa", released in Ramadan 2020. Like Makafaat, it was popular during its run and was renewed for a second season and aired in Ramadan 2021.

References

2019 Pakistani television series debuts
Urdu-language television shows
Television anthology episodes
Pakistani anthology television series
Geo TV original programming
Pakistani drama television series